Bahadur Shah II, usually referred to by his poetic title Bahadur Shah Zafar (Zafar  Victory) was born Mirza Abu Zafar Siraj-ud-din Muhammad (24 October 1775 – 7 November 1862) and was the twentieth and last Mughal Emperor of India as well as an Urdu poet. He was the second son and the successor to his father, Akbar II, who died on 28 September 1837. He was a titular Emperor, as the Mughal Empire existed in name only and his authority was limited only to the walled city of Old Delhi (Shahjahanbad). Following his involvement in the Indian Rebellion of 1857, the British exiled him to Rangoon in the British-controlled Burma in 1858, after convicting him on several charges.

Bahadur Shah Zafar's father, Akbar II, had been imprisoned by the British and he was not his father's preferred choice as his successor. One of Akbar Shah's queens  pressured him to declare her son, Mirza Jahangir, as his successor. However, the East India Company exiled Jahangir after he attacked their resident in the Red Fort, paving the way for Bahadur Shah to assume the throne.

Reign

Bahadur Shah Zafar ruled over a Mughal Empire that had by the early 19th century been reduced to only the city of Delhi and the surrounding territory as far as Palam. The Maratha Empire had brought an end to the Mughal Empire in the Deccan during the 18th century and the regions of India formerly under Mughal rule had either been absorbed by the Marathas or had declared independence and become smaller kingdoms. The Marathas installed Shah Alam II in the throne in 1772, under the protection of the Maratha general Mahadaji Shinde and maintained suzerainty over Mughal affairs in Delhi. The East India Company became the dominant political and military power in mid-nineteenth century India. Outside the region controlled by the company, hundreds of kingdoms and principalities fragmented their land. The emperor was respected by the company, who provided him with a pension. The emperor permitted the company to collect taxes from Delhi and maintain a military force in it. Zafar never had any interest in statecraft or had any "imperial ambition". After the Indian Rebellion of 1857, the British exiled him from Delhi.

Bahadur Shah Zafar was a noted Urdu poet, having written a number of Urdu ghazals. While some part of his opus was lost or destroyed during the Indian Rebellion of 1857, a large collection did survive, and was compiled into the Kulliyyat-i-Zafar. The court that he maintained was home to several renowned Urdu scholars, poets and writers including Mirza Ghalib, Daagh Dehlvi, Momin Khan Momin, and Mohammad Ibrahim Zauq (who was also Bahadur Shah Zafar's mentor).

After Zafar's defeat, he said:
Ghāzīyoñ meñ bū rahe gī jab talak īmān kī
As long as there remains the scent of Iman in the hearts of our Ghazis,

Takht-i-Landan tak chale gī tegh Hindostān kī.
So long shall the sword of Hindustan flash before the throne of London.

War of Independence 1857
As the Indian Independence war of 1857 spread, Sepoy regiments reached the Mughal Court at Delhi. Because of Zafar's neutral views on religions, many Indian kings and regiments accepted and declared him as the Emperor of India.

On 12 May 1857, Zafar held his first formal audience in several years. It was attended by several sepoys who were described as treating him "familiarly or disrespectfully". When the sepoys first arrived at Bahadur Shah Zafar's court, he asked them why they had come to him, because he had no means of maintaining them. Bahadur Shah Zafar's conduct was indecisive. However, he yielded to the demands of the sepoys when he was told that they would not be able to win against the East India Company without him.

On 16 May, sepoys and palace servants killed fifty-two Europeans who were prisoners of the palace and who were discovered hiding in the city. The executions took place under a peepul tree in front of the palace, despite Zafar's protests. The aim of the executioners who were not the supporters of Zafar was to implicate him in the killings. Once he had joined them, Bahadur Shah II took ownership for all the actions of the mutineers. Though dismayed by the looting and disorder, he gave his public support to the rebellion. It was later believed that Bahadur Shah was not directly responsible for the massacre, but that he may have been able to prevent it, and he was therefore considered a consenting party during his trial.

The administration of the city and its new occupying army was described as "chaotic and troublesome", which functioned "haphazardly". The Emperor nominated his eldest son, Mirza Mughal, as the commander in chief of his forces. However, Mirza Mughal had little military experience and was rejected by the sepoys. The sepoys did not have any commander since each regiment refused to accept orders from someone other than their own officers. Mirza Mughal's administration extended no further than the city. Outside Gujjar herders began levying their own tolls on traffic, and it became increasingly difficult to feed the city.

During the Siege of Delhi when the victory of the British became certain, Zafar took refuge at Humayun's Tomb, in an area that was then at the outskirts of Delhi. Company forces led by Major William Hodson surrounded the tomb and Zafar was captured on 20 September 1857. The next day, Hodson shot his sons Mirza Mughal and Mirza Khizr Sultan, and grandson Mirza Abu Bakht under his own authority at the Khooni Darwaza, near the Delhi Gate and declared Delhi to be captured. Bahadur Shah himself was taken to his wife's haveli, where he was treated disrespectfully by his captors. When brought news of the executions of his sons and grandson, the former emperor was described as being so shocked and depressed that he was unable to react.

Trial
The trial was a consequence of the Sepoy Mutiny and lasted for 21 days, had 19 hearings, 21 witnesses and over a hundred documents in Persian and Urdu, with their English translations, were produced in the court. At first the trial was suggested to be held at Calcutta, the place where Directors of East India company used to their sittings in connection with their commercial pursuits. But instead, the Red Fort in Delhi was selected for the trial. It was the first case to be tried at the Red Fort.

Zafar was tried and charged on four counts:

On the 20th day of the trial Bahadur Shah II defended himself against these charges. Bahadur Shah, in his defense, stated his complete haplessness before the will of the sepoys. The sepoys apparently used to affix his seal on empty envelopes, the contents of which he was absolutely unaware. While the emperor may have been overstating his impotence before the sepoys, the fact remains that the sepoys had felt powerful enough to dictate terms to anybody. The eighty-two-year old poet-king was harassed by the mutineers and was neither inclined to nor capable of providing any real leadership. Despite this, he was the primary accused in the trial for the rebellion.

Hakim Ahsanullah Khan, Zafar's most trusted confidant and both his Prime Minister and personal physician, had insisted that Zafar did not involve himself in the rebellion and had surrendered himself to the British. But when Zafar ultimately did this, Hakim Ahsanullah Khan betrayed him by providing evidence against him at the trial in return for a pardon for himself.

Respecting Hodson's guarantee on his surrender, Zafar was not sentenced to death but exiled to Rangoon, Burma. His wife Zeenat Mahal and some of the remaining members of the family accompanied him. At 4 am on 7 October 1858, Zafar along with his wives, two remaining sons began his journey towards Rangoon in bullock carts escorted by 9th Lancers under command of Lieutenant Ommaney.

Death

In 1862, at the age of 87, he had reportedly acquired some illness. In October, his condition deteriorated. He was "spoon-fed on broth" but he found that difficult too by 3 November. On 6 November, the British Commissioner H.N. Davies recorded that Zafar "is evidently sinking from pure desuetude and paralysis in the region of his throat". To prepare for his death Davies commanded for the collection of lime and bricks and a spot was selected at the "back of Zafar's enclosure" for his burial. Zafar died on Friday, 7 November 1862 at 5 am. Zafar was buried at 4 pm near the Shwedagon Pagoda at 6 Ziwaka Road, near the intersection with Shwedagon Pagoda road, Yangon. The shrine of Bahadur Shah Zafar Dargah was built there after recovery of his tomb on 16 February 1991. Davies commenting on Zafar, described his life to be "very uncertain".

Family and descendants

Bahadur Shah Zafar had four wives and numerous concubines. His wives were:

Begum Ashraf Mahal
Begum Akhtar Mahal
Begum Zeenat Mahal
Begum Taj Mahal

He had twenty two sons including:

Mirza Dara Bakht Miran Shah (1790–1841)
Mirza Muhammed Shahrukh Bahadur 
Mirza Kayumar Bahadur
Mirza Fath-ul-Mulk Bahadur (alias Mirza Fakhru) (1816–1856)
Mirza Muhammad Quwaish Bahadur
Mirza Mughal (1817–1857)
Mirza Farkhanda Shah Bahadur
Mirza Khizr Sultan (1834–1857)
Mirza Bakhtavar Shah Bahadur
Mirza Sohrab Hindi Bahadur
Mirza Abu Nasr
Mirza Muhammad Bahadur
Mirza Abdullah
Mirza Kuchak Sultan
Mirza Abu Bakr (1837–1857)
Mirza Jawan Bakht (1841–1884)
Mirza Shah Abbas (1845–1910)
He had at least thirty-two daughters including:

Rabeya Begum
Begum Fatima Sultan
Kulsum Zamani Begum
Raunaq Zamani Begum (possibly a granddaughter, d. 1930)

Many individuals claim to be descendants of Bahadur Shah Zafar, living in places throughout India, such as Hyderabad, Aurangabad, Delhi, Bhopal, Kolkata, Bihar, and Bangalore. However, the claims are often disputed.

Religious beliefs

Bahadur Shah Zafar was a devout Sufi. He was regarded as a Sufi Pir and used to accept murids or pupils. The newspaper Delhi Urdu Akhbaar described him as "one of the leading saints of the age, approved of by the divine court." Before his accession, he lived like "a poor scholar and dervish", differing from his three royal brothers, Mirza Jahangir, Salim and Babur. In 1828, a decade before he succeeded the throne, Major Archer said that "Zafar is a man of spare figure and stature, plainly apparelled, almost approaching to meanness." His appearance is that of an indigent munshi or teacher of languages".

As a poet, Zafar imbibed the highest subtleties of mystical Sufi teachings. He was also a believer of the magical and superstitious side of the Orthodox Sufism. Like many of his followers, he believed that his position as both a Sufi pir and emperor gave him spiritual powers. In an incident in which one of his followers was bitten by a snake, Zafar tried to cure him by giving a "seal of Bezoar" (a stone antidote to poison) and some water on which he had breathed to the man to drink.

The emperor had a staunch belief in ta'aviz or charms, especially as a palliative for his constant complaint of piles, or to ward off evil spells. During a period of illness, he told a group of Sufi pirs that several of his wives suspected that someone had cast a spell over him. He requested them to take some steps to remove all apprehension on this account. The group wrote some charms and asked the emperor to mix them in water and drink it, which would protect him from the evil. A coterie of pirs, miracle workers and Hindu astrologers were always in touch with the emperor. On their advice, he would sacrifice buffaloes and camels, buried eggs and arrested alleged black magicians, and wore a ring that cured for his indigestion. He also donated cows to the poor, elephants to the Sufi shrines and horses to the khadims or clergy of Jama Masjid.

In one of his verses, Zafar explicitly stated that both Hinduism and Islam shared the same essence. This philosophy was implemented by his court which embodied a multicultural composite Hindu-Islamic Mughal culture. He celebrated many Hindu festivals like Rakhi, Holi, Diwali etc in the court. Zafar was also tolerant of Shia Muslims who regained their lost influence at the Mughal court under him.

Epitaph
He was a prolific Urdu poet and calligrapher. He wrote the following Ghazal (Video search) as his own epitaph. In his book, The Last Mughal, William Dalrymple states that, according to Lahore scholar Imran Khan, the beginning of the verse, umr-e-darāz māṅg ke ("I asked for a long life") was not written by Zafar, and does not appear in any of the works published during Zafar's lifetime. The verse was allegedly written by Simab Akbarabadi.

Image Gallery

In popular culture

Zafar was portrayed in the play 1857: Ek Safarnama set during the Indian Rebellion of 1857 by Javed Siddiqui. It was staged at Purana Qila, Delhi ramparts by Nadira Babbar and the National School of Drama repertory company in 2008. A Hindi-Urdu black-and-white movie, Lal Quila (1960), directed by Nanabhai Bhatt, showcased Bahadur Shah Zafar extensively.

TV Serials and Films
A television show Bahadur Shah Zafar aired on Doordarshan in 1986. Ashok Kumar played the lead role in it.

In the 2001 Hindi historical drama series 1857 Kranti, on DD National, the character of Bahadur Shah Zafar was played by S. M. Zaheer.

In the 2005 Hindi Movie Mangal Pandey: The Rising, directed by Ketan Mehta, the character of Bahadur Shah Zafar was played by Habib Tanveer.

See also

 List of Mughal Emperors
 Emperor/Empress of India
 List of Indian monarchs
 List of Urdu poets
 Shahzada Muhammad Hidayat Afshar, Ilahi Bakhsh Bahadur

References

Bibliography
Portrait of Bahadur Shah in 1840s The Delhi Book of Thomas Metcalfe

External links

 Extract of talk by Zafar's biographer William Dalrymple (British Library)
Poetry

Bahadur Shah Zafar at Kavita Kosh 
 Bahadur Shah Zafar Poetry
 Extracts from a book on Bahadur Shah Zafar, with details of exile and family
 Bahadur Shah Zafar Ghazals
 Links to further websites on Bahadur Shah Zafar
 Poetry on urdupoetry.com
Kalaam e Zafar – Select verses 

Descendants

 BBC Report on Bahadur Shah's possible descendants in Hyderabad
 
 Another article on Bahadur Shah's descendants in Hyderabad
 An article on Bahadur Shah's descendants in Kolkata
 Forgotten Empress: Sultana Beghum sells tea in Kolkata

Zafar
Zafar
Mughal emperors
Urdu-language poets
People from Delhi
Revolutionaries of the Indian Rebellion of 1857
Indian exiles
19th-century Indian people
Indian Sunni Muslims
19th-century Urdu-language writers
Urdu-language writers from British India
Urdu-language writers from Mughal India